The Clare Senior Football Championship is an annual Gaelic Athletic Association club competition organised by Clare GAA between the top twelve gaelic football clubs in County Clare, Ireland. The winners represent the county in the Munster Senior Club Football Championship, the winners of which progress to the semi-finals of the All-Ireland Senior Club Football Championship. The Clare SFC final is generally held in the month of October and is played at Cusack Park in Ennis.

In 2014 Cratloe completed a historic first Clare Senior Championship 'Double' in eighty-five years since the famous Ennis Dalcassians in 1929.

In 2016 a Football Review Agreement decided that from 2019 onwards the Clare Senior and Intermediate Football Championships would both involve twelve teams in an effort to make both more competitive. This meant that five clubs would lose their senior status and be relegated down to the Clare Intermediate Football Championship. The eleven remaining senior clubs would be joined by the intermediate champions to form the new senior championship, and thereby increasing the intermediate championship from eight to twelve teams. 2018 saw the relegation of Doora-Barefield, Kilfenora, O'Curry's, St. Breckan's and Wolfe Tones down to the intermediate championship.

As part of the 2016 Football Review Agreement, a pathway was left open for any amalgamations that wished to enter the senior championship. Two intermediate clubs - Naomh Eoin and O'Curry's - from the Loop Head Peninsula in West Clare took up this opportunity for 2019. After their relative success, their near neighbours St. Senan's, Kilkee were due to join them under the name  Western Gaels  for the 2022 senior championship. However, they pulled out of the championship before it began.

The 2022 champions, and holders of the Jack Daly Cup are Éire Óg, Ennis who successfully defended their crown to win back-to-back titles and their twentieth overall title. They defeated Ennistymon by 0-09 to 0-06 in Cusack Park, Ennis.

Senior clubs
 The thirteen clubs that will participate in the 2023 Clare Senior Football Championship are:

Venues

Early rounds
Fixtures in the opening rounds of the championship are usually played at a neutral venue that is deemed halfway between the participating teams. Some of the more common venues include Hennessy Park in Miltown Malbay and Kilmihil. Cusack Park in Ennis also hosts several double-headers in the early rounds of the championship.

Final
The final is regularly played at Cusack Park in Ennis. Named after the founder of the GAA, Michael Cusack, the ground had an original capacity of about 28,000, but following a 2011 safety review, the certified capacity was reduced to 14,864. In 2015 a major renovation started, this included the demolition and re-erection of the main stand and construction of a new entrance/exit at the north side of the stadium. Once completed in late 2017 the official capacity was increased to 19,000

Roll of honour

List of finals

 North Clare was a two-time temporary amalgamation similar to the modern-day divisional teams seen in Cork and Kerry. North Clare drew it's players from the Ballyvaughan-Fanore, Corofin, Ennistymon, Kilfenora, Liscannor, Michael Cusack's and St. Breckan's football clubs. They competed together at senior level when they were all competing at either intermediate or junior level individually. North Clare played in three county finals in 1934, 1977 and 1978, losing on each occasion to Kilrush Shamrocks.

 When Ennis Dalcassians won the 1943 Clare Junior Football Championship, they offered an opportunity to players from fellow junior club, Doora-Barefield, to join with them and enter the 1944 senior championship as the Ennis Faughs. In 1952 when Ennis Dalcassians became Éire Óg, the Ennis Faughs continued to play at senior level until disbanding after losing the 1956 county final. In a thirteen year period, the Ennis Faughs reached eleven county finals, winning four senior titles in 1947, 1948, 1952 and 1954. When Ennis Dals were relegated back down to junior level in 1945, a second Ennis Faughs team also entered and immediately won the 1946 Clare Intermediate Football Championship.

 In 1993, Éire Óg and Doora-Barefield were both competing at intermediate level. Éire Óg once again offered an opportunity to players from Doora-Barefield to join with them and try to replicate their previous successes. The new Ennis Faughs entered and immediately won the 1994 Clare Senior Football Championship, defeating Kilrush Shamrocks in the county final after a replay. They reached back-to-back county finals in 1995, but relinquished their title to Doonbeg. As Éire Óg won the 1995 Clare Intermediate Football Championship, the Ennis Faughs were once again disbanded. Doora-Barefield subsequently went on to win the 1997 Clare Intermediate Football Championship.

Records and statistics

Consecutive championships
 5-in-a-row:
 Once by  Kilrush Shamrocks (1975-1979)
 3-in-a-row:
 Twice by  Doonbeg  (1967-1969), and (1972-1974)
 Once by  Ennis Dalcassians (1909-1911)

"The Double"
The following clubs have won both the Clare Senior Football Championship and Clare Senior Hurling Championship in the same year:
 Four times by  Ennis Dalcassians (1980, 1911, 1914, 1929)
 Once by  Cratloe (2014)

By decade
The most successful team of each decade, judged by number of Clare Senior Football Championship titles they won, is as follows:
 1880s: Two titles for  Newmarket-on-Fergus (1887, 1888)
 1890s: Three titles for  Ennis Dalcassians (1890, 1897, 1899)
 1900s: Three titles for  Ennis Dalcassians (1904, 1907, 1909)
 1910s: Four titles for  Ennis Dalcassians (1910, 1911, 1913, 1914)
 1920s: Three titles for  St. Joseph's, Miltown Malbay (1923, 1925, 1927)
 1930s: Five titles for  Kilrush Shamrocks (1930, 1931, 1934, 1937, 1938)
 1940s: Two titles for  Ennis Faughs (1947, 1948)
 1950s: Three titles for  Kilrush Shamrocks (1951, 1957, 1958)
 1960s: Four titles for  Doonbeg (1961, 1967, 1968, 1969)
 1970s: Five titles for  Kilrush Shamrocks (1975, 1976, 1977, 1978, 1979)
 1980s: Three titles for  Doonbeg (1982, 1983, 1988)
 1990s: Five titles for  Doonbeg (1991, 1995, 1996, 1998, 1999)
 2000s: Four titles for  Kilmurry-Ibrickane (2002, 2004, 2008, 2009)
 2010s: Four titles for  Kilmurry-Ibrickane (2011, 2012, 2016, 2017)
 2020s: Two titles for  Éire Óg, Ennis (2021, 2022)

Barren spells
The longest gaps between successive Clare Senior Football Championship titles are:
 70 years:  Shannon Gaels, Labasheeda (1900-1970)
 42 years:  St. Senan's, Kilkee (1942-1984)
 40 years:  Éire Óg, Ennis (1954-1994)
 30 years:  Kilmurry-Ibrickane (1933-1963)
 27 years:  Cooraclare (1918-1945), and  Kilmurry-Ibrickane (1966-1993)
 26 years:  St. Joseph's, Miltown Malbay (1959-1985)
 25 years:  St. Joseph's, Miltown Malbay (1990-2015)
 21 years:  Cooraclare (1965-1986)
 17 years:  St. Joseph's, Miltown Malbay (1932-1949)
 15 years:  Ennis Dalcassians (1914-1929), and  Éire Óg, Ennis (2006-2021)
 14 years:  St. Senan's, Kilkee (1928-1942)
 13 years:  Kilrush Shamrocks (1938-1951) & (1962-1975)
 12 years:  Kilrush Shamrocks (1912-1924)
 11 years:  Cooraclare (1945-1956) & (1986-1997), and  St. Senan's, Kilkee (1992-2003)
 10 years:  St. Joseph's, Miltown Malbay (1906-1916)

See also
 Clare Football League Div. 1 (Cusack Cup)
 Clare Intermediate Football Championship
 Clare Junior A Football Championship
 Clare Under-21 A Football Championship

References

External links
 Official Clare Website
 Clare on Hoganstand
 Clare Club GAA

 
Senior Gaelic football county championships